V. hastata may refer to:
 Verbena hastata, the blue vervain or swamp verbena, a flowering plant species
 Verbesina hastata, a flowering plant species in the genus Verbesina
 Viola hastata, the halberd-leaf yellow violet, a flowering plant species in the genus Viola

See also
 Hastata (disambiguation)